Edelény is a district in northern part of Borsod-Abaúj-Zemplén County. Edelény is also the name of the town where the district seat is found. The district is located in the Northern Hungary Statistical Region.

Geography 
Edelény District borders with the Slovakian region of Košice to the north, Encs District and Szikszó District to the east, Miskolc District to the south, Kazincbarcika District and Putnok District to the west. The number of the inhabited places in Edelény District is 45.

Municipalities 
The district has 2 towns and 43 villages.
(ordered by population, as of 1 January 2012)

The bolded municipalities are cities.

Demographics

In 2011, it had a population of 33,314 and the population density was 46/km².

Ethnicity
Besides the Hungarian majority, the main minorities are the Roma (approx. 6,000), Polish and Rusyn (150) and German (130).

Total population (2011 census): 33,314
Ethnic groups (2011 census): Identified themselves: 36,295 persons:
Hungarians: 29,602 (81.56%)
Gypsies: 6,052 (16.67%)
Others and indefinable: 641 (1.77%)
Approx. 3,000 persons in Edelény District did declare more than one ethnic group at the 2011 census.

Religion
Religious adherence in the county according to 2011 census:

Catholic – 17,695 (Roman Catholic – 15,213; Greek Catholic – 2,480);
Reformed – 6,666; 
other religions – 308; 
Non-religious – 2,251; 
Atheism – 120;
Undeclared – 6,274.

Gallery

See also
List of cities and towns of Hungary
Edelény Subregion (until 2013)

References

External links
 Postal codes of the Edelény District

Districts in Borsod-Abaúj-Zemplén County